The Picture of Dorian Gray (El retrato de Dorian Gray), is a 1969 Mexican telenovela, based on the 1890 novel The Picture of Dorian Gray by Oscar Wilde. The main character is the handsome young man called Dorian Gray (played by late Enrique Álvarez Félix).

Cast 
Enrique Álvarez Félix as Dorian Gray 
Carlos Bracho as Lord Henry
Carmen Montejo as Lady Wooton 
Blanca Sánchez as Verónica
Nelly Meden as Elizabeth
Silvia Pasquel as Sybil Vane
Alicia Montoya
Claudia Islas
Anita Blanch as Lady Agatha 
Héctor Sáez as James Vane

See also
Adaptations of The Picture of Dorian Gray

Notes

External links 

The Picture of Dorian Gray 

Mexican telenovelas
Televisa telenovelas
Spanish-language telenovelas
1969 telenovelas
1969 Mexican television series debuts
1969 Mexican television series endings
Works based on The Picture of Dorian Gray